The Honda Activa is a motor scooter made by Honda Motorcycle and Scooter India (HMSI). It was launched in India in May 1999. Production in Mexico began in 2004. It is a 109/125 cc,  scooter. The vehicle has the option of kick- and self-start.

History 
Honda began selling a new version of the Activa in the Indian market on 8 May 2009, with a new  engine. Honda said the Fuel economy was improved by 15%.

In April 2014, Honda began an upgraded model of Activa with a  engine and rebranded the model as Activa 125. Currently, both Activa-i and Activa 125 are sold in India along with traditional Honda Activa.

Honda began selling the Activa-i in India, a cheaper and lighter version of the Activa, in December 2013. It is powered by a  engine. On September 22, 2015, Honda announced that they had sold over 1 million Activas in five months in the Indian market, from April to August.

Honda launched their 5th generation of Honda Activa in 2018, and the sixth-generation Honda Activa 6G have been launched in India with prices starting at ₹ 63,912 (ex-showroom, Delhi).

Milestones 
In April, 2014, The Economic Times reported the Honda Activa to be the best selling two wheeler in India, outselling the Hero Splendor. During the month of September 2013, 141,996 Honda Activa scooters were sold, nearly equal to Honda's entire annual sales in North America.

The 110cc Activa is the company's biggest seller, by far. It is responsible for over 200,000 sales units each month.

In November 2018, HMSI crossed the 2.5 crore sales mark in the scooter segment. It has become the first company to reach this milestone and the biggest contributor to this massive figure is the Honda Activa.

It took Honda 13 years to achieve the one crore sales figure, but it managed to add another crore in the span of just three years. It then went on to achieve the next 50 lakh in just one year. Honda claims that it is now India's top scooter-selling brand, holding 57 percent of the market share. Honda has also said that every second scooter sold in India is one of theirs.

Awards

2001 
Scooter of the Year 2001 (BS Motoring)

2002 
Scooter of the Year by Overdrive Magazine

2007 
Best automobile brand of India 2007   (Planman Media)

2008 
Scooter Customers Satisfaction No.1 - CNBC TV18 - Auto Car "Auto Awards 2008

2009 
Scooter of the Year - ET ZigWheels Awards 2009

2018 
DROOM – Buyer's Choice Scooter Of The Year
DROOM – Dealer's choice scooter of the Year
DROOM – Jury's choice scooter of the Year
Most sold scooter on Droom

2019 
Jury's choice Pre-Owned Scooter of the year (Droom Pre-Owned Auto awards)
Buyer's Choice Pre-Owned Scooter of the Year (Droom Pre-Owned Auto awards)

2020 

 Scooter of the Year (Jagran HiTech Awards) (Activa 6G)

2021 

 Best Innovation and Integrated Campaign- 2 Wheeler (CarAndBike Awards, 2021)(Activa 6G)

Gallery

References

Activa
Indian motor scooters
Motorcycles introduced in 2000
Motor scooters